The 2020 United States Senate election in New Hampshire was held on November 3, 2020, to elect a member of the United States Senate to represent the State of New Hampshire, concurrently with the 2020 U.S. presidential election, as well as other elections to the United States Senate, elections to the United States House of Representatives and various state and local elections. Incumbent Democratic Senator Jeanne Shaheen won reelection to a third term after comfortably defeating Republican nominee Bryant Messner by 15.6 points and sweeping every single county in the state. This marked the first Senate election since 1972 in which the Democrat carried Belknap County.

Shaheen's final margin outperformed Democratic presidential nominee Joe Biden in the concurrent presidential election by around 8 percentage points.

The primary election was held on September 8, 2020.

Democratic primary

Candidates

Nominee
Jeanne Shaheen, incumbent U.S. Senator

Eliminated in primary
Tom Alciere, former Republican state representative
Paul J. Krautmann, former dentist

Endorsements

Results

Republican primary

Candidates

Nominee
Bryant Messner, corporate attorney and former U.S. Army soldier

Eliminated in primary
Gerard Beloin, ski instructor
Don Bolduc, former U.S. Army Special Forces brigadier general
Andy Martin, journalist and perennial candidate

Withdrew
Bill O'Brien, former Speaker of the New Hampshire House of Representatives

Declined
Kelly Ayotte, former U.S. Senator and former Attorney General of New Hampshire
Al Baldasaro, state representative (endorsed Bill O'Brien)
Scott Brown, U.S. Ambassador to New Zealand and Samoa, former U.S. Senator from Massachusetts, 2014 Republican nominee for the U.S. Senate in New Hampshire
Eddie Edwards, former police chief of South Hampton, former chief of the New Hampshire State Division of Liquor Enforcement, and nominee for New Hampshire's 1st congressional district in 2018(Accepted executive state appointment)
Corey Lewandowski, President Donald Trump's former campaign manager
Jay Lucas, businessman
Chris Sununu, incumbent Governor of New Hampshire (running for re-election)

Endorsements

Polling

Results

Other candidates

Libertarian Party

Nominee
Justin O'Donnell, Libertarian nominee for New Hampshire's 2nd congressional district in 2018, Qualified for General Election Ballot by Petition on 09/02/2020

Bull Moose Party

Did not qualify
Thomas Sharpe V, firefighter and U.S. Navy Veteran

General election

Predictions

Endorsements

Polling

with Don Bolduc

with Corey Lewandowski

with Bill O'Brien

with Chris Sununu

with Kelly Ayotte

with Generic Democrat and Generic Republican

Results 

Counties that flipped from Republican to Democratic
 Belknap (largest municipality: Laconia)
 Hillsborough (largest municipality: Manchester)
 Rockingham (largest municipality: Derry)

See also
 2020 New Hampshire elections

Notes
Partisan clients

Voter samples

References

External links
 
 
  (State affiliate of the U.S. League of Women Voters)
 

Official campaign websites
 Corky Messner (R) for Senate 
 Justin O'Donnell (L) for Senate 
 Jeanne Shaheen (D) for Senate

2020
New Hampshire
United States Senate